= Milcorus =

Town in ancient Macedonia

Milcorus or Milkoros (Ancient Greek: Μίλκωρος) was a town of the Chalcidice in ancient Macedonia. It belonged to the Delian League since it appears in the tribute records of Athens between 435/4 and 433/2 BCE. It is probable that it was one of the cities that rebelled against Athens in 432 BCE.

Its site is unlocated.
